Opie Ortiz is an American artist specializing in tattoos, pop art and murals. Ortiz is best known for his art featured on Sublime album covers. Murals painted by Ortiz can be found in and around Long Beach, California.

Career
Ortiz operated American Beauty Tattoo for approximately seven years before opening World Famous Tattoo. He currently works at Still Life Tattoo, located in Seal Beach, California. 

Ortiz was also responsible for the "Sublime" tattoo across Bradley Nowell's upper back, which appeared on the cover of the multi-platinum self-titled album Sublime, along with the flower art covering the front of the CD. He also created the burning sun on the cover of 40 Oz. to Freedom, the cover artwork for Second-hand Smoke, 1997's Doin' Time EP, as well as the Everything Under the Sun box set. 

In 2019, Oritz was featured in Sublime, a documentary about the band.

Ortiz has been a member of the band Dubcat. He currently a member of Long Beach Dub Allstars and is the lead singer on the band's 2020 self-titled album.

External links
Official Site
SublimeSpot page

References 

Living people
People from Long Beach, California
Sublime (band)
American tattoo artists
Year of birth missing (living people)
Long Beach Dub Allstars members